Local elections were held in Antipolo on May 13, 2013, within the Philippine general election. The voters elected for the elective local posts in the city: the mayor, vice mayor, the 2 congressmen, and the councilors, eight in each of the city's 2 legislative districts.

Background
Incumbent Mayor Danilo Leyble ran for re-election. He was challenged by incumbent Rizal Governor Casimiro "Jun" Ynares III and independent  Jose Velasco.

Incumbent Vice Mayor Susana Garcia Say ran for re-election. She was challenged by incumbent Second District Councilor Rolando "Puto" Leyva and independent Danilo Quizon.

Incumbent First District Representative Roberto "Robbie" Puno ran for re-election. He was challenged by Francisco Sumulong Jr., brother of former Mayor Victor Sumulong, Dioscoro Esteban, Florante "Ante" Quizon, and Salvador "Raldy" Abaño.

Incumbent Second District Romeo Acop ran for re-election, He was challenged by Lorenzo Juan "LJ" Sumulong III and Silverio "Ver" Bulanon.

Results

For Mayor  
Mayor Danilo Leyble was defeated by Governor Casimiro "Jun" Ynares III.

For Vice Mayor 
Vice Mayor Susan Garcia Say was defeated by Brgy. Dalig Chairman and former Councilor Ronaldo "Puto" Leyva.

For Representative

First District 
Cong.Roberto "Robbie" Puno was re-elected.

Second District 
Cong. Romeo M. Acop defeated Lorenzo Juan "LJ" Sumulong III, son of former Mayor Victor Sumulong.

For Board Member 
All two legislative districts of Antipolo will elect Sangguniang Panlalawigan or provincial board members.

First District 
Board Member Dr. Enrico "Rico" De Guzman defeated his closest rival Ernesto Prias.

|-

|-

Second District 
Board Member Jesus Angelito "Joel" Huertas Jr. was re-elected.

For City Councilors

Candidates

Administration coalition (Team P-Noy-Antipolo)

Primary opposition coalition (Team Ynares-Say)

First District 

|-bgcolor=black
|colspan=18|

Second District 

|-bgcolor=black
|colspan=25|

References

2013 Philippine local elections
Politics of Antipolo
Elections in Antipolo
2013 elections in Calabarzon